Katarzyna Teodorowicz-Lisowska (born 28 November 1972) is a former professional tennis player from Poland. She was born Katarzyna Teodorowicz.

Biography
Teodorowicz, who comes from Ruda Śląska in the south of Poland, played professionally in the 1990s.

She partnered with Magdalena Mroz to win Poland a Fed Cup tie against France in her first Fed Cup campaign in 1991, winning a live doubles rubber over Mary Pierce and Nathalie Tauziat. The same pair also won the decisive doubles match against Sweden in 1992 to put Poland into the World Group quarter-finals for the first time. They also teamed up together in the women's doubles at the 1992 Summer Olympics, losing in three sets to seventh seeded Argentines Mercedes Paz and Patricia Tarabini in the first round. In the 1993 Fed Cup, Poland were sent to the World Group playoffs after losing to Indonesia. They were able to win the playoff against Great Britain, with Teodorowicz teaming up again with Mroz to win the deciding doubles rubber.

At grand slam level she twice competed in the main draw of the women's doubles, at the 1993 Australian Open and 1994 French Open.

She studied at the University of Physical Education in Katowice and won silver medals in the women's doubles at the Summer Universiade in both 1997 and 1999.

Her last Fed Cup appearance came in 2000 and she retired having featured in a total of 22 ties for Poland.

ITF Circuit finals

Singles: 2 (2–0)

Doubles: 27 (18–9)

References

External links
 
 
 

1972 births
Living people
Polish female tennis players
Universiade medalists in tennis
Tennis players at the 1992 Summer Olympics
Olympic tennis players of Poland
Sportspeople from Ruda Śląska
Universiade silver medalists for Poland
20th-century Polish women